The Uganda National Oil Company (UNOC), also known as the National Oil Company of Uganda, is a limited liability petroleum company in Uganda owned by the Ugandan government. The 2013 Petroleum (Exploration, Development and Production) Act of Uganda provides for the establishment of the national oil company. UNOC's board of directors was inaugurated on 23 October 2015 by the president of Uganda.

Location
The headquarters of UNOC are located in Fairway Tower, at 15 Yusuf Lule Road, on Nakasero Hill, in Kampala, Uganda's capital and largest city. The coordinates of UNOC headquarters are 0°19'42.0"N, 32°34'57.0"E
(Latitude:0.328333; Longitude:32.582500).

Overview
The government of Uganda (GOU)'s goal as set out in the country's energy policy (2002) and National Oil and Gas policy (2008) is to ensure the sustainable utilization of discovered petroleum resources to contribute to early achievement of poverty eradication and create lasting value to society. One of the key objectives is to ensure an adequate, reliable, and affordable supply of quality petroleum products in the country. The petroleum deposits discovered so far are estimated at 6.5 billion barrels, of which 1.4 billion barrels are considered recoverable.

The state can participate with between 15 and 20 percent in production, according to existing production-sharing agreements between the state and the three oil exploration companies: Tullow Oil of the United Kingdom, TotalEnergies of France, and the China National Offshore Oil Corporation. It is the National Oil Company that will participate in production on behalf of the state. The Uganda Oil Refinery that is in the development phase calls for 40 percent participation by the state. The national oil company will invest in the refinery on behalf of the state. It is also expected that the new oil company will maintain a petroleum products retail network.

Financing
Plans were underway to develop a 60,000 barrel per day refinery to serve Uganda and its immediate neighbours. The refinery is being developed on a private-public partnership basis (60 percent to 40 percent). GOU is in the process of finalising the selection process of a strategic investor who will take up the private shareholding. The refinery is expected to boost the security of supply of petroleum products and provide an outlet for the discovered resources.

In February 2022, Proscovia Nabbanja, the chief executive of the Uganda National Oil Company, said the project promised a tenfold return on every dollar invested.

In July 2022, the ownership in Uganda's crude oil production facilities the Albertine Graben was as illustrated in the table below. This excludes ownership in the East African Crude Oil Pipeline and the Uganda Oil Refinery.

Subsidiaries
UNOC has two wholly owned subsidiaries: the Uganda Refinery Holding Company headed by General Manager Michael Nkambo Mugerwa,  and the Uganda National Pipeline Company headed by General Manager John Bosco Habumugisha.

JPST is joint venture between UNOC and a private company, One Petroleum Limited. The facility had  in storage as of November 2017.

In December 2018, the shareholders of UNOC resolved that the company will own 15 percent equity in East African Crude Oil Export Pipeline (EACOP), up to 40 percent equity in the Uganda Oil Refinery and at least 51 percent equity in the Kampala Storage Terminal (KST) to be located at Namwabula Village in Mpigi District. UNOC is expected to operate and manage the KST.

Governance

The board is chaired by Emmanuel Katongole, an economist and businessman. He is a co-founder of Cipla Quality Chemical Industries Limited, a pharmaceutical company in eastern Africa and the major supplier of anti-retroviral medications in Uganda. He was first appointed in August 2014 and was re-appointed for another five years on 12 November 2019.

The board members include Francis Nagimesi, a former chief executive officer of the defunct Coffee Marketing Board of Uganda; Francis Twinamatsiko, a principal economist in the Ugandan Ministry of Finance, Planning and Economic Development; Grace Tubwita Bagaya Bukenya, a physical planner; Pauline Irene Batebe, a chemical/refinery engineer in the Petroleum Directorate of Uganda; Godfrey Andama, a senior geoscientist; and Stella-Marie Biwaga, a lawyer working with FIDA, Uganda. In November 2019, Zulaika Mirembe Kasaija replaced Grace Tubwita Bagaya Bukenya on the board.

In June 2016, Josephine Wapakhabulo, an electric and electronics engineer, was appointed managing director and chief executive officer of UNOC, being the first person to serve in that position. In August 2019 Wapakhabulo resigned. After serving in acting capacity for 45 days, Proscovia Nabbanja, a geologist, was confirmed as the substantive CEO, the second person to serve in that capacity.

First oil
The winner of the tender was expected to be made public in April 2018. At prevailing crude oil prices of US$60 per barrel, the crude, extracted during testing and exploration was valued at about US$2.7 million (KSh271 million).

When the first bidding process failed to attract a credible buyer, the oil was re-advertised in June 2018. Failure to dispose of the crude oil before the Uganda oil refinery is completed, will make the refinery the default buyer. At the prevailing trading price of $74 (UShs280,000) per barrel of Brent crude oil, the 45,211 barrels could fetch about US$3.3m (about UShs 13 billion), as of June 2018.

In November 2019, the Daily Monitor newspaper reported that Uganda National Oil Company had secured a buyer for the test crude oil. The crude oil is stored in specialized containers at four sites; Kasemene 1, Ngara-1, Ngiri-2 in Buliisa District and at Tangi Camp in Nwoya District. At the prevailing price of WTI crude oil at US$55.06 (USh:202,048) per barrel, the 45,211 barrels could potentially yield US$2,489,318 (about USh9 billion), as of November 2019.

Bulk petroleum products trading
In March 2020 UNOC signed a memorandum of understanding (MOU) with Stabex International Limited, an oil products distributor in the African Great Lakes Region. UNOC will import oil products in bulk and sell them to Stabex for onward distribution. Other distributors are being sought.

According to The EastAfrican, the MV Uhuru, a Kenyan vessel, owned by the Kenya Pipeline Corporation, transports bulk refined oil products (gasoline, diesel-fuel, kerosene and jet fuel) from Kisumu to Jinja Petroleum Storage Terminal and UNOC distributes them nationally and regionally.

See also

 Irene Muloni
 Mary Goretti Kitutu
 Petroleum Authority of Uganda
 National Oil Corporation of Kenya
 Uganda–Kenya Crude Oil Pipeline
 Uganda–Tanzania Crude Oil Pipeline
 Oil companies in Uganda

References

External links
 Uganda: Wapakhabulo Appointed CEO of Uganda National Oil Company
 Abu Dhabi hosts Uganda’s oil chief and top executives As of 15 November 2018.

Oil companies of Uganda
National oil and gas companies
Non-renewable resource companies established in 2014
Economy of Uganda
2014 establishments in Uganda
Government-owned companies of Uganda
Energy companies established in 2014